The I Heart Revolution: With Hearts as One is the ninth album by Hillsong United and the first of the three-part "I Heart Revolution" project. With Hearts as One was recorded around the world across the span of two years, and contains thirty songs. The album was released in Australia on 8 March 2008, and internationally on various later dates. It peaked at No. 8 on the ARIA Albums Chart. The album was initially released in both physical and digital formats, along with a USB release. A companion DVD was also released in September 2008.

The second part, The I Heart Revolution: We're All in This Together, is a feature film documentary which was released in cinemas beginning November 2009.

Background
In 2006, Hillsong United's key songwriter and creative director Joel Houston proposed a three-part series of releases under the banner of "The I Heart Revolution", stating it's not about loving revolution, but simply about the revolution of the use of the term "I heart...". The first of these was initially to be the eighth album (and first studio album) by Hillsong United. That album was simply released with the title All of the Above. The second of these to be part of the series was to be an extended play release compiled of performances by Hillsong United's under 21-year-old members. This ended up being released without the I Heart Revolution title also, only under the title In a Valley by the Sea. Finally, having recorded every performance by themselves for the prior two years, Hillsong United decided to release a compilation album comprising the best performances of the best of the whole era of Hillsong United, while including two new songs, "You'll Come", written and performed by Brooke Fraser, and "Love Enough", written by Braden Lang and Scott Ligertwood and performed by Jonathon Douglass, who had previously sung the song for the Under 21 EP, but not for a "full" Hillsong United album. Both of these new songs were performed in Sydney, while all other songs included were from throughout the world. As the album was recorded throughout the world, the cover art also features notable landmarks from throughout the world, including O Cristo Redentor (Christ the Redeemer), which appears two times on the cover, including at the centre of the heart. Others featured include the Empire State Building, the Eiffel Tower, the Colosseum, Big Ben, the Statue of Liberty and various pictures of people from throughout the world.

Release

Formats

As with most albums, it was released as a CD and also on digital music retailers, but was also released on a one gigabyte USB flash drive, enveloped in a black rubber wristband. This USB version included all of the songs in MP3 format, the lyrical overhead master sheets, a PDF copy of the liner sleeve, and the two versions of the album cover.

The live DVD version, with documentary elements and overlays from cities, worship events and moments around the world, was released in September 2008.  The DVD will feature a selection of 18 songs from the CD version.

Charts
In its first eligible week, beginning 23 March 2008, the album peaked at No. 8 in the albums section of ARIA Charts and remained in the charts for the following three weeks, in lower positions. In New Zealand, it charted at No. 36 in its week of release, though climbed to its peak position of No. 22 in the following week of 17 March 2008. In the US, it peaked at No. 117 on the Billboard 200 albums chart on 19 April 2008.

Track listing

DVD track list

Performances
01. "The Time Has Come" 06:25
02. "One Way" 03:38
03. "What The World Will Never Take" 04:16
04. "Look To You" 04:15 
05. "Take All Of Me" 08:03
06. "The Stand" 05:32
07. "Nothing But The Blood" 03:50
08. "Hosanna" 06:14
09. "Fuego De Dios (Fire Fall Down)" 
01:41  
10. "Shout Unto God" 04:15  
11. "Love Enough" 03:05 
12. "Take It All" (Spanish) 08:04
13. "All I Need Is You" 06:01 
14. "None But Jesus" 07:59
15. "From The Inside Out" (Spanish) 06:00
16. "Came To My Rescue" 03:44 
17. "Salvation Is Here" 04:04 
18. "Tell The World" 04:35
19. "Solution" 05:56

Special features
 "Point of Difference" [Music Video]  
 Behind the Scenes: Live Moments, Tour Blogs and more

Album personnel
Mixed By
James Rudder
Andrew Crawford

Recording Engineers
Brad Law
Steve Pippett
Andrew Crawford
Phil Blackbourn

Record Assistant Engineers
Josh Nickel
James Hurley

People Who Made It Sound Good - DVD Credits 
Assistant DVD Mixing 
Jim Monk
Ben Whincop

Mastered By 
Tom Cryne
Leon Zervos

Post Production Senior Engineer
Ben Whincop

Post Production Record Engineers
Phil Blackbourn
Andrew Crawford
Peter Wallis
Trevor Beck
Jim Monk
Josh Nickel
James Hurley

Charts
Year-end charts

References

Hillsong United albums
Live video albums
2008 live albums
2008 video albums